Margaret Ménégoz (born Margit Katalin Baranyai; 21 April 1941) is a Hungarian-born German-French film producer. She has produced more than 60 films since 1976. She was a member of the jury at the 40th Berlin International Film Festival. She has worked with Michael Haneke on several of his films, including Amour, which was nominated for the Academy Award for Best Picture in 2012.

Selected filmography

 Perceval le Gallois (1978)
 Koko: A Talking Gorilla (1978)
 Le Pont du Nord (1981)
 The Lady of the Camellias (1981)
 The Aviator's Wife (1981)
 Le Beau Mariage (1982)
 Danton (1983)
 Pauline at the Beach (1983)
 Sheer Madness (1983)
 Liberty Belle (1983)
 Improper Conduct (1984)
 Full Moon in Paris (1984)
 Le tartuffe (1984)
 The Green Ray (1986)
 Boyfriends and Girlfriends (1987)
 The Possessed (1988)
 Europa Europa (1990)
 A Tale of Springtime (1990)
 A Tale of Winter (1992)
 Louis, the Child King (1993)
 A Summer's Tale (1996)
 The Season of Men (2000)
 Our Lady of the Assassins (2000)
 Time of the Wolf (2003)
 Hidden (2005)
 The White Ribbon (2009)
 Early One Morning (2011)
 Amour (2012)
 Une Enfance (2015)
 Amnesia (2015)
 Happy End (2017)

References

External links

1941 births
Living people
Film people from Budapest
Hungarian film producers
German film producers
French film producers
European Film Awards winners (people)
Filmmakers who won the Best Foreign Language Film BAFTA Award
French people of Hungarian descent
German people of Hungarian descent